Tillie Moreno, also known as "Manila's Queen of Soul", is a Filipino R&B/soul/pop vocalist and entertainer whose career began in the 1970s. She is best known for her songs "Saan Ako Nagkamali", "Umagang Kay Ganda" and "Nothing I Want More". She was a member of the bands Circus Band and Lovelife.

Biography

Early life
Tillie Moreno, who was born in Manila, Philippines, became interested in music and performing at the young age of eleven.

References

External links
 Tillie @ Asian Talent Online
 Tillie's New Sound
 Tillie – PI Jazz Fest
 Bworldonline Article
 ManilaBulletinOnline Article
 JazzPhil-USA

Filipino musicians
Filipino women pop singers
Filipino emigrants to the United States
American musicians of Filipino descent
Singers from Manila
1953 births
Living people